Nuestra Belleza Chihuahua 2010, was held at the Auditorio de las 3 Culturas, Cuauhtémoc, Chihuahua on August 4, 2010. At the conclusion of the final night of competition, Pamela Olivas of the capital city Chihuahua was crowned the winner. Olivas  was crowned by outgoing Nuestra Belleza Chihuahua titleholder, Daniela Muñoz. Eight contestants competed for the state title.

Results

Placements

Special awards

Background Music
Rodrigo Fernández

Contestants

Contestants Notes
Pamela Olivas was elected Miss Earth Chihuahua 2009 and she represented her State in the national competition Miss Earth Mexico 2009 in Yucatán, where she won the title de Miss Air (1st Runner-up).

References

External links
Official Website

Nuestra Belleza México